OFK Teplička nad Váhom is a Slovak association football club located in Teplička nad Váhom. It currently plays in 3. liga (3rd tier in Slovak football system). The club was founded in 1928.

References

External links
 Futbalnet profile 
 Club website 
 

Football clubs in Slovakia
Association football clubs established in 1928
1928 establishments in Slovakia